Catherine Mary Mowat (born 20 September 1952) is an English former cricketer who played as a right-arm medium bowler. She appeared in 5 Test matches and 3 One Day Internationals for England between 1978 and 1984. She played domestic cricket for Middlesex.

References

External links
 

1952 births
Living people
Sportspeople from Carlisle, Cumbria
Cricketers from Cumbria
England women Test cricketers
England women One Day International cricketers
Middlesex women cricketers